Radermachera ramiflora is a tree in the genus Radermachera of the family Bignoniaceae. The specific epithet  is from the Latin meaning "flowering on the branches".

Description
The bark is greyish. The flowers are yellow.

Distribution and habitat
Radermachera ramiflora is endemic to Malaysian Borneo where it is confined to Sabah state. Its habitat is in rainforest and on hillsides, typically on ultramafic soils, from sea-level to  elevation.

References

ramiflora
Endemic flora of Borneo
Trees of Borneo
Plants described in 1934
Taxonomy articles created by Polbot
Flora of the Borneo lowland rain forests